Nogometni klub Žalec, commonly referred to as NK Žalec or simply Žalec, is a Slovenian football club from Žalec which plays in the MNZ Celje's Intercommunal League. The club was founded in 1920.

Honours
Slovenian Fourth Division
 2018–19

Slovenian Fifth Division
 2011–12

MNZ Celje Cup
 1992

League history since 1991

References

External links
Official website 
Weltfussballarchiv profile

Association football clubs established in 1920
Football clubs in Slovenia
1920 establishments in Slovenia